In Greek mythology, Stymphalus or Stymphalos (Ancient Greek: Στύμφαλος) was a king of Arcadia. He was the eponym of the town Stymphalus (now Stymfalia) and of a spring near it.

Family 
Stymphalus was a son of Elatus and Laodice, brother of Pereus, Aepytus, Ischys and Cyllen.  Stymphalus' sons were Agamedes, Gortys and Agelaus, himself father of Phalanthus who reputedly gave his name to a homonymous mountain and a city; Stymphalus also had at least one daughter, Parthenope, the mother of Everes by Heracles.

Mythology 
Stymphalus was treacherously killed by Pelops, who, being unable to defeat him at war, pretended to establish friendship with him, only to approach and slay the inadvertent Stymphalus; he then chopped off his limbs and scattered them around. As punishment for Pelops' crime, the gods had Greece suffer from infertility until the pious Aeacus was asked to pray for relief of the calamity.

A "rationalized" version of a myth of the Stymphalian birds names "a certain hero" Stymphalus and a woman Ornis (literally "bird") as parents of a set of daughters, the Stymphalides, who were killed by Heracles over the fact that they denied him hospitality but received the Molionidae.

Notes

References 

 Apollodorus, The Library with an English Translation by Sir James George Frazer, F.B.A., F.R.S. in 2 Volumes, Cambridge, MA, Harvard University Press; London, William Heinemann Ltd. 1921. ISBN 0-674-99135-4. Online version at the Perseus Digital Library. Greek text available from the same website.
Pausanias, Description of Greece with an English Translation by W.H.S. Jones, Litt.D., and H.A. Ormerod, M.A., in 4 Volumes. Cambridge, MA, Harvard University Press; London, William Heinemann Ltd. 1918. . Online version at the Perseus Digital Library
Pausanias, Graeciae Descriptio. 3 vols. Leipzig, Teubner. 1903.  Greek text available at the Perseus Digital Library.

Mythological kings of Arcadia
Kings in Greek mythology
Arcadian mythology